The Sum of No Evil is the tenth studio album by the progressive rock band The Flower Kings, with the return of the drummer Zoltan Csörsz. The limited edition is supplied in a digipak and with a bonus disc.

Track listing

Bonus Disc

Personnel
 Roine Stolt - vocals, guitars, additional keyboards
 Tomas Bodin - piano, organ, synthesizers, mellotron
 Hasse Fröberg - vocals, guitars
 Jonas Reingold - bass guitar
 Zoltan Csörsz - drums
with
 Hasse Bruniusson - marimba, glockenspiel, percussion
 Ulf Wallander - soprano saxophone
 Ed Unitsky - album artwork

References

The Flower Kings albums
2007 albums
Inside Out Music albums